The Guadalupe-Blanco River Authority or GBRA was formed in 1933 by the Texas legislature. Its main concerns are water supply and water conservation in the Guadalupe River Basin, which includes the Blanco, Comal, and San Marcos rivers. The authority extends over ten counties. The general offices of the authority are located at 933 East Court Street in Seguin.

Dams and reservoirs 
The GBRA currently operates dams that form seven reservoirs along the Guadalupe River in Texas:

 Lake Dunlap
 Lake Gonzales
 Lake McQueeney
 Meadow Lake
 Lake Placid
 Lake Wood

Other reservoirs managed by the GBRA include:

 Coleto Creek Reservoir

References

See also 

 Upper Guadalupe River Authority
 List of Texas river authorities

Public utilities established in 1933
Guadalupe River (Texas)
River authorities of Texas
Water companies of the United States